Nobby Clark can refer to:

Nobby Clark (cricketer) (1902–1982), English cricketer
Nobby Clark (ice hockey) (1897–1966), Canadian National Hockey League player
Nobby Clark (footballer) (born 1954), Scottish retired footballer
Nobby Clark (photographer), English photographer
 Neil "Nobby" Clark, former CEO of the National Australia Bank
 Gordon "Nobby" Clark, Bay City Rollers
Nobby Clark (politician) (born 1951 or 1952), New Zealand local politician

See also
Nobby Clarke (1907–1981), English football wing half
Alfred E. Clarke Mansion in San Francisco, built by Alfred "Nobby" Clarke
Neil Clarke (Australian footballer) (1957–2003)
William Clarke (cryptographer) (1883–1961), British intelligence officer and cryptographer of naval codes in both World Wars
Nobby